Panacela is a genus of moths in the family Eupterotidae.

Species
 Panacela lewinae Lewin, 1807
 Panacela nyctopa (Turner, 1922)
 Panacela syntropha Turner, 1922

Status unknown
 Panacela signicosta Strand

Former species
 Panacela pilosa Walker, 1865

References

Panacelinae